The Next Episode is the third studio album by American R&B trio Next. It was released on J Records on December 17, 2002 in the United States.

Critical reception

AllMusic rated the album two stars out of five. Billboard found that The Next Episode "walks that fine line between sensuality and pure sexuality with a swagger all its own."

Track listing

Sample credits
 "Imagine That" contains samples from the composition "If You Play Yours Cards Right", written by Kevin McCord by Alicia Meyers.
 "Feels Good" contains replayed elements from the composition "(Theme From) Hill Street Blues", written by Michael Postil.
 "Hold Me Down" contains excerpts from the composition "Saturday Night", written by Thomas McClary and Harold Hudson and performed by The Commodores.
 "That's My Word" contains samples from the composition "Time Is Passing", written by Byron Byrd and performed by Sun.
 "Brand New" contains samples from the composition "I Found Love (When I Found You)", written by Sherman Marshall and Phil Pugh and performed by The Spinners.

Charts

References

2002 albums
Next (American band) albums
J Records albums